The 1998–99 AS Nancy Lorraine season was the club's 89th season in existence and the third consecutive season in the top flight of French football. In addition to the domestic league, Nancy participated in this season's editions of the Coupe de France and the Coupe de la Ligue. The season covered the period from 1 July 1998 to 30 June 1999.

Players

First-team squad

Transfers

Pre-season and friendlies

Competitions

Overview

French Division 1

League table

Results summary

Results by round

Matches

Source:

Coupe de France

Coupe de la Ligue

References

External links

AS Nancy Lorraine seasons
Nancy